Encoptarthria is a genus of Australian ground spiders that was first described by Barbara York Main in 1954. Originally placed in the no longer recognized family Prodidomidae, it was moved to the family Gnaphosidae in 2007.

Species
 it contains five species:
Encoptarthria echemophthalma (Simon, 1908) (type) – Australia (Western Australia)
Encoptarthria grisea (L. Koch, 1873) – Australia
Encoptarthria penicillata (Simon, 1908) – Australia (Western Australia)
Encoptarthria perpusilla (Simon, 1908) – Australia (Western Australia)
Encoptarthria vestigator (Simon, 1908) – Australia (Western Australia)

References

Araneomorphae genera
Gnaphosidae
Spiders of Australia